Ricky McIntosh (born 26 October 1967) is a Jamaican bobsledder. He competed in the two man and the four man events at the 1992 Winter Olympics.

References

External links
 

1967 births
Living people
Jamaican male bobsledders
Olympic bobsledders of Jamaica
Bobsledders at the 1992 Winter Olympics
Place of birth missing (living people)